In mathematics, the Koenigs function is a function arising in complex analysis and dynamical systems. Introduced in 1884 by the French mathematician Gabriel Koenigs, it gives a canonical representation as dilations of a univalent holomorphic mapping, or a semigroup of mappings, of the unit disk in the complex numbers into itself.

Existence and uniqueness of Koenigs function
Let D be the unit disk in the complex numbers. Let  be a holomorphic function mapping D into itself, fixing the point 0, with  not identically 0 and   not an automorphism of D, i.e. a Möbius transformation defined by a matrix in SU(1,1).

By the Denjoy-Wolff theorem,   leaves invariant each disk |z | < r and the iterates of  converge uniformly on compacta to 0: in fact for 0 <   < 1, 

for |z | ≤ r with M(r ) < 1. Moreover  '(0) =  with 0 < || < 1.

 proved that there is a unique holomorphic function h defined on D, called the Koenigs function,  
such that (0) = 0,  '(0) = 1 and Schröder's equation is satisfied,

The function h is the uniform limit on compacta of the normalized iterates,  .

As a consequence, when  (and hence ) are univalent,  can be identified with the open domain .

Proof
Uniqueness. If  is another solution then, by analyticity, it suffices to show that k = h near 0. Let 
 
near 0. Thus H(0) =0, H'''(0)=1 and, for |z | small,

Hence  near 0.Existence. If  then by the Schwarz lemma

On the other hand,

Hence gn converges uniformly for |z| ≤ r by the Weierstrass M-test sinceUnivalence. By Hurwitz's theorem, since each gn is univalent and normalized, i.e. fixes 0 and has derivative 1 there , their limit  is also univalent.

Koenigs function of a semigroup
Let  be a semigroup of holomorphic univalent mappings of  into itself fixing 0 defined 
for  such that

 is not an automorphism for  > 0

Each  with  > 0 has the same Koenigs function, cf. iterated function. In fact, if h is the Koenigs function of 
, then   satisfies Schroeder's equation and hence is proportion to h.

Taking derivatives gives

Structure of univalent semigroups
It follows that the semigroup is differentiable at 0. Let

Then

so that

and

the flow equation for a vector field.

Restricting to the case with 0 < λ < 1, the h(D'') must be starlike so that

Since the same result holds for the reciprocal,

so that  satisfies the conditions of 

Conversely, reversing the above steps, any holomorphic vector field   satisfying these conditions is associated to a semigroup  , with

Notes

References

  ASIN: B0006BTAC2

Complex analysis
Dynamical systems
Types of functions